Linan is a town in Putian, southern Fujian Province, China. It is under the administration of Xianyou County, and controls 2 neighbourhood committees and 16 villages.

References 

Township-level divisions of Fujian
Putian